The Blekinge Street Gang was a Danish far-left criminal group. Between December 1972 and May 1989, they committed many robberies, sending the money to the Popular Front for the Liberation of Palestine. They killed one person during their final robbery in 1988. The 1989 discovery of a large cache of their weapons and explosives in a hideout on Blekingegade ("Blekinge Street") gave the gang its press name. The gang referred to themselves as the inner core of three organizations named KAK, KUF and KA/M-KA.

Criminal style (MO) 
All crimes after 1972 were committed to provide money or weapons to PFLP. In their commission of these crimes, the gang followed some common principles.

During the preparation phase, they maintained absolute secrecy, never saying anything on the phone, making sure they were not followed, and not even telling their closest family what they were doing. Each big heist was usually preceded by weeks or months of detailed planning, preparations and surveillance. The surveillance/stakeouts were usually done on foot or from the back of small, closed vans. When renting cars, apartments etc. they used stolen identities and false driver licenses, taking care to avoid using the stolen identities in ways that would be noticed by the victim (such as spending the victim's money). They routinely used professional countersurveillance techniques including spotting unmarked police cars, evasive driving, calling between payphones, etc.

They concealed their identity by always using full disguises, including masks and theatrical makeup. They did not reveal their political affiliation or motives, viewing them as crimes with a practical goal, not public demonstrations of force or terror. During criminal activity, they never carried any papers with their real names or addresses in order to give the other gang members time to get away before the police figured out who they had arrested. They always used freshly stolen getaway vehicles equipped with previously stolen unrelated license plates.

During robberies, they used a quick in-out approach. Most crimes were completed in a matter of seconds or minutes. They were extremely brutal during the crime to intimidate the victims and avoid casualties. Their goal was to take the loot, getaway cars, etc., without relying on the victims to do anything but flee or freeze. They aimed to avoid serious human casualties. When this rule was broken in the last robbery, the police redoubled their efforts and arrested the gang.

1963 to 1970 Open rebellion

Political activities
In 1963, as a result of the Sino-Soviet split, the world's national communist parties split into pro-China (Maoist) and pro-USSR factions. The official Communist Party of Denmark (DKP) sided with Moscow. That year, Gotfred Appel unofficially founded the Communist Task Force (KAK) to move the DKP towards Marxist-Leninist-Mao Zedong Thought ideology, and he was expelled from DKP in September 1963. That same month, Appel founded the publishing and printing company "Futura" which took over the lucrative contract to translate and print the Danish language publications of the Chinese Embassy. This contract was formerly held by the DKP newspaper Land og Folk, with Gotfred Appel as the primary contact. Futura also became the publisher of the party newspaper Communist Briefing and other publications of KAK. Futura's biggest commercial success would be the official Danish translation of Mao Zedong's The Little Red Book. In December 1963, Appel formally founded KAK as a new independent "party". On February 8, 1965, KAK organized the first Danish "Vietnam demonstration" against the Vietnam War, and founded the first Danish "Vietnam committee" on January 14, 1966.

Gotfred Appel's big ideological theory was published in an extensive series of articles in "Communist Briefing" during 1966 and 1967. His "leech state theory" theorized that the rich countries make so much money by exploiting third world countries that even their "poorest" citizens are so rich they are effectively "bribed" into being part of the capitalist bourgeoisie and unlikely to participate in any Communist revolution until this source of wealth dried out due to liberation of the third world. (See Maoism–Third Worldism for a discussion of similar ideas). Accordingly, western communists who really wanted a communist ideal state must first help liberate third world countries from western exploitation. This theory was the basis of all future activities in both the party and the gang. The theory was later published as a book. During the fall of 1967, Jens Holger Jensen made the acquaintance of Gottfred Appel during a small one-man KAK-demonstration and almost immediately began helping out and soon joined KAK.

In September 1967, the Maoists also left the youth wing of the DKP, (Communist Youth of Denmark), and KAK created its own youth chapter, KUF, with its own newspaper The Young Communist, on March 26, 1968. During 1968, the Maoists left KAK and formed the "Communist Association Marxists - Lenininsts" (KFML ), later renamed to "Communist Workers Party" (KAP ). The Chinese embassy cancelled the publishing contract with Futura on July 30, 1969, as Gotfred Appel insisted that the various "student" uprisings in the west were not the start of a new communist revolution, but merely internal strife in the bourgeoisie, from which new communists could be recruited. The official National People's Congress had passed a resolution to the contrary. From this point on, KAK would be based solely on Marxism-Leninism and Appel's theories, and in the fall of 1969, "The Young Communist" dedicated an issue to Palestine in general and the PFLP in particular. It publicly hailed PFLP as a revolutionary movement with the right ideology. This praise continued throughout many subsequent issues.

Criminal activities

KUF played a leading role in a violent demonstrations against the Vietnam War on April 27, 1968, and against the John Wayne movie The Green Berets on May 5, 1969. PFLP was founded in the Middle East in December 1967, with a communist agenda for post-liberation Palestine, and fathered modern terrorism by hijacking an El Al airliner in Rome on July 22, 1968. In October 1969, two KUF members were the first Westerners to train in PFLP training camps in Jordan, namely active KUF street fighters blacksmith Gert Rasmussen and toolsmith Hans "Xander" Truelsen. When PFLP wanted to train them for a specific operation, Gert got scared, fled home to Denmark, and was expelled from KUF for "unreliable and indecent behaviour." Xander also left KUF before the real gang activity began in 1972.

From June to July 1970, Jens Holger Jensen, Peter Døllner and Jørgen Poulsen were in PFLP training camps in Lebanon and Jordan. During those months Carlos the Jackal was also trained in PFLP camps in Lebanon and Jordan, but may not have met the KUF members. At about the same time founders of the German RAF were also trained in Palestinian camps in the near middle east, and Oevig says they too trained in PFLP camps, while the gang members says the RAF founders trained in Fatah camps in Jordan. Gotfred Appel and Ulla Hauton visited the PFLP in Jordan from September 1 to 22, 1970, including a visit to the site of the infamous triple Dawson's Field hijackings. They escaped the country just as the Jordan government struck back during the Black September.

While Appel and Hauton were abroad, KUF attempted arson with Molotov cocktails against the Danish "Bella Center" conference center on September 8, 1970, in an unsuccessful attempt to prevent the 1970 World Bank Summit, and spearheaded violent demonstrations against the World Bank Summit from September 20 to 25. Gotfred Appel only avoided arrest as he could prove he was in Jordan at the time. Hans 'Xander' Truelsen spent three weeks in prison. On November 21, 1970, Niels Jørgensen arrested for pro-PFLP graffiti.

1970 to 1977 Liberation Support

Political activities
To avoid a repeat of the pointless violence committed by KUF while Gotfred Appel and Ulla Hauton were out of the country in September 1970, all outward actions and demonstrations were stopped in late 1970. Appel took direct control of KUF and officially told the members to spend the next several years studying Marxist-Leninist theory. Some KUF members chose not to stay on at this time. This may be a cover story, as an underground criminal cell was formed at the same time (see further below).

Inspired by the Canadian Liberation Support Movement, KAK founded the charity Clothes to Africa (TTA) in July 1972, collecting used clothing and other used items which they cleaned up and sent to refugee camps run by like-minded 3rd world liberation movements. The first shipment was 0.9 tons shipped to the MPLA from Angola in 1972. They sent a further 8.7 tons to FRELIMO in Mozambique and PFLOAG in Oman in 1973, 4.7 tons to FRELIMO in 1974, 13.3 tons to MPLA, PFLO in Oman, and ZANU in Zimbabwe in 1975, 9.1 tons ZANU in 1976, and 27.3 tons to ZANU in 1977.

Jens Holger Jensen purchased a bungalow for Gotfred Appel and Ulla Hauton on July 25, 1976. Jens Holger Jensen took up residence in a "henhouse" on the same plot. The source of money is officially unknown. From November 1977 to May 1978, Ulla Hauton led a witch hunt amongst the male KAK and KUF membership, using methods such as isolating members from friends (including other members), forced "self-criticism" and outright beatings.

Criminal activities
To avoid further troubles with the police, KAK/KUF was converted from a very active group of violent demonstrators to a very secret underground cell in late 1970; led by Gottfred Appel, Ulla Hauton and Jens Holger Jensen. The former top activist Hans 'Xander' Truelsen refused to participate and left the organization. In July 1971, Gotfred Appel and Ulla Hauton had negotiated with PFLP-leader Wadi Haddad in Beirut, Lebanon. Between December 22, 1972, and January 10, 1973, KUF broke into a small Danish National Guard depot and stole three machine pistols, four machine guns, some armor-piercing rifles, each complete with its separately stored vital parts, ammunition, tools and other accessories. No other items (not even cash money) was taken. Some of these weapons were found in the gang hideout after their arrest in 1989.

The coordinator of all European PFLP-EO activities Michel Moukharbal was arrested in Paris on June 27, 1975, and briefly betrayed the organization, leading French police to a hideout where Carlos the Jackal was partying. Carlos killed Moukharbal and two policemen, wounding the third. Amongst Moukharbal's papers was a reference to KAK and KOUF: KUF misspelled in French. In July 1975, Jens Holger Jensen led a field trip to PFLP in Lebanon.

The gang now allegedly staged a number of coups. The gang is suspected of robbing a transport of cash to the local branch of the unemployment fund of the Unskilled Workers Union on December 9, 1975. The amount robbed was DKK 0.5 million (US$81,000)). On September 2, 1976, the gang allegedly robbed a transport of cash from a post office, which yielded DKK 0.55 million (US$91,000). The gang allegedly used fake duplicate tax return money orders (each with a small realistic amount) and fake drivers licenses to defraud the Postal service of a total amount of DKK 1.4 million (US$240,000) on November 8, 1976). It is suspected that Jan Weimann had inside knowledge of the security codes in the brand new money order system.

Gotfred Appel, Ulla Hauton, Jens Holger Jensen, and possibly one more KAK member, negotiated with Wadi Haddad in Baghdad, Iraq in February 1977. There are two conflicting versions of these negotiations:
 In 1988/1989 Gottfred Appel told the police that those present were himself, Ulla Hauton, Jens Holger Jensen and Wadi Hadded (of those, only Gottfred Appel was alive at the time of the interrogation), and claimed that Wadi Haddad wanted KAK to assist in terrorist operations, but that KAK refused, although Jens Holger Jensen wanted to participate. In 2009, the gang claimed that this version of the story was intended to make the police believe that Appel would never participate in any crimes, but that the young breakaways in KA (see below) might do such things, while not incriminating any living persons.
 In 2008/2009, the gang claimed that those present were an undisclosed gang member, Gottfred Appel, Ulla Hauton, Jens Holger Jensen and Wadi Haddad (of those, only the undisclosed member was alive in 2008/2009). The meeting was to evaluate the political relevance of cooperating with Wadi Haddad's PFLP-EO in addition to George Habash's PFLP. Wadi Hadded did not want to discuss politics at all and all four KAK members agreed that PFLP-EO was too elitist and not rooted in the Palestinian people, and thus not worthy of KAK's cooperation.

In 1977, Jens Holger Jensen may have staked out Palma de Mallorca Airport in preparation of the joint PFLP/RAF Landshut Hijacking. This is only according to the Gottfred Appel version of the meeting with Wadi Haddad in February 1977. On December 31, 1977, the group conducted a secret live fire training exercise in a forest, using the New Year's fireworks as a cover. This was the only illegal action in which Gotfred Appel was ever proved actively involved, as he was the lookout and was stopped by police in possession of a radio illegally tuned to the police radio frequency. From November 1977, almost all legal and illegal activities had ground to a halt due to Hauton's feminist witch hunt in KAK/KUF.

1977 to 1988 Collective Liberation Support

Political activities
A grand meeting of the KAK membership expelled Ulla Hauton on May 4, 1978, and due to his insistence, also expelled KAK founder Gotfred Appel. In the aftermath, Gotfred Appel secured the legal rights to the name KAK, and the majority changed the name to "Communist Workgroup" (KA,  or M-KA), the publishing activity was renamed from "Futura" to "Manifest", and the newspaper from "Communist Briefing" to "Manifest". Where KAK had a single unchallenged leader, KA instituted a collective leadership, roughly consisting of the active gang members. In August 1978, the majority split into two groups; KA focused on continuing the interrupted legal and illegal activity, while Marxist Workgroup (MAG) focused on analyzing the organizational failure and then dissolves itself in 1980. KA was formally established on September 3, 1978.

From October to November 1979, the female doctor "Anna" volunteered in a Red Cross/PFLP refugee camp Nahr-El-Barred north of Tripoli, Lebanon. TTA had continued its activity and shipped about 70 tons of clothes to ZANU in 1978. As people started to sell their used items instead of donating it to charities, TTA was deemed no longer profitable on November 17, 1986. TTA was closed down and the efforts were redirected to a new fund-raising project: an all-volunteer café named "Café Liberation". Café Liberation opened for business in April 1987, but never managed to make a profit despite everybody working for free.

Criminal activities
PFLP Intelligence chief Marwan El-Fahoum had been assigned KA's new primary PFLP contact in May 1979. On October 9, 1979, Jens Holger Jensen and Niels Jørgensen faked a trip to the US to go underground for a year. Six days later nameless wanted-posters for "person 1" and "person 2" were secretly circulated to Danish Police and maybe some foreign agencies. On July 7, 1980, the gang allegedly kidnapped a bank manager and his family in their own home and tried to get access to the bank vault. It failed and the family was released. The gang still denies involvement in this crime and the charges were dropped before trial. During a stakeout near Aarhus, Denmark on September 15, 1980, a runaway lorry crashed head first into their stakeout van killing Jens Holger Jensen instantly, while Niels Jørgensen had briefly stepped outside the van. Niels Jørgensen pretended he was never there and later presented himself as next of kin to take possession of various items from the scene. Peter Døllner was arrested on March 19, 1981, for using a fake drivers license in an assumed name to collect the proceeds from selling another stakeout van. The punishment was just a fine.

In July 1981, all of KA's members visited PFLP in Lebanon. From 1982 to 1984, Bo Weimann began compiling a file of potential Mossad operatives in Denmark. The file happened to include a lot of Jews, but the group later insisted that listing or killing Jews in general was never the goal, just figuring out which ones were actively fighting for Mossad in a manner similar to KA's own relationship with the PFLP. At trial this is ruled espionage. On April 2, 1982, the gang allegedly robbed postal workers carrying cash to a bank, yielding DKK 0.786 million (US$96,000) ) in cash and DKK 72 million in worthless checks. The gang allegedly robbed an armored Bank van on March 2, 1983, robbing DKK 8.3 million (US$960,000 ). No individual gang member was found guilty in this. Two Palestinian PFLP-members were arrested in Paris with DKK 6 million in suspicious cash on March 26, 1983. The investigation was bungled.

The gang had broken into a Swedish army depot on November 9, 1982, stealing a large amount of heavy weaponry (mostly Swedish brands), including bazookas, anti-personnel mines, plastic explosives and boxes of ammunition; all with complete accessories etc. In February 1983, the gang allegedly staked out several Swedish police stations as potential targets for stealing light weaponry. The plan was dropped because they did not believe there were enough guns in each police station to justify the risk. In September 1983, the group made an alleged stakeout of a Norwegian army depot in the hope of repeating the success from the Swedish depot. The plans were dropped because transporting the previously obtained Swedish weapons to the PFLP on the West Bank had turned out to be too difficult. From 1984 to 1988, small consignments of stolen weapons were carefully packaged and literally buried in various forests near Vienna, Zürich and Paris for later pickup by PFLP or its allies. On September 3, 1986, a police informant led French police to one of the buried consignments of weapons near Paris. It was not discovered who buried the weapons, only that PFLP was the intended recipient.

With funding and practical assistance from PFLP, the gang planned and prepared between 1982 and 1985 to kidnap Jörn Rausing (a son of industrialist Gad Rausing) from his home in Sweden, intending to demand a US$25 million ransom. The plan failed seconds before the grab on January 7, 1985, apparently because the original stakeout got the hinges on his front door wrong. PFLP pressured the gang to try again, but the stress from the long high-stakes preparations made the gang fall apart and the kidnap was not retried.

On September 27, 1985, the gang moved its hideout from its old address to a new apartment on Blekinge Street in Copenhagen. The new hideout apartment was rented in the name of a fictitious computer club, and all documents were signed in the name of a stolen identity, while the bills were paid in cash to avoid alerting the real person by that name. On December 3, 1985, the gang robbed a money transport from a post office, yielding DKK 1.5 million (US$160,000 ) in cash and DKK 68 million in cancelled checks. No individual gang member was found guilty in this. Niels Jørgensen was arrested during an attempted car theft on June 3, 1986. To avoid arousing any suspicion by the gang, the police pretended to believe his cover story and the charges were silently reduced to a fine. On Monday December 22, 1986, the gang stole the Christmas weekend takings of Danish clothing mega store "", as those takings were being picked up by a bank courier. During the escape from the mega store, they fought off several shop employees, including the security chief (a former elite soldier) who sustained a fractured skull from pistol-beating. For their next robbery, the gang therefore developed a new soft baton designed not to cause skull fractures. The robbery yielded about DKK 4.7 million (US$0.63 million) in cash. No individual gang member was found guilty in this.

1988 Old Main Post Office robbery 
The gang's last robbery came on November 3, 1988, at 05:13:40 am. They robbed a postal transport of money and valuables as it arrived at the old central postal office, carrying DKK 9.3 million (US$1.4 million) in cash and bearer bonds plus about DKK 5 million in other valuables. As the gang left with their takings, the police arrived earlier than anticipated. In the ensuing shootout, a rookie police officer was killed by buckshot from the sawed-off shotgun used during the robbery. This enraged the police so badly that they decided to actually share information between the secret police and the robbery squad.

The target of this robbery was the daily transport of cash from local retail bank branches to the banking headquarters in Copenhagen. The cash was transported by the national postal service as detailed below, and the gang targeted the only stretch in which the total amount would be transported by car, before being divided up for distribution to the individual bank headquarters. Planning and stakeouts for the robbery began more than one year before the heist, in the fall of 1987.

The mail delivery
Monday, October 31, 1988, was payday for many of people, who began early Christmas shopping on the next day. On the evening of Tuesday, as on all days, shops all over the country deposited the days takings in drop-boxes at their local retail bank branches. In the morning of Wednesday, November 2, 1988, bank branches counted the deposits and credited them to the shop's accounts. In the afternoon, bank branches carried their excess cash to the local post offices and mailed it as insured high-value mail. The same service was used by a few other businesses sending valuable goods such as bearer bonds and expensive office equipment. In the evening, local post offices presorted the mail by destination post office as indicated by the zip code. Most of the bank cash would be going a Copenhagen post office.

On Wednesday November 2, 1988, at 22:00, the gang members Torkil Lauesen, Jan Weimann, Niels Jørgensen, Carsten Nielsen, and Marc Rudin met at the hideout in Blekingegade and put the plan in motion. At night, postal trains picked up the day's mail (most post offices are conveniently at the train stations) and dropped them off at the destination post offices. The gang stole four or five cars and parked them at strategic locations. An orange Toyota HiAce van was parked in Løvstræde across from the back gate of the post office.

On Thursday, November 3, 1988, at 04:25, postal trains delivered mail at the postal rail terminal between Copenhagen central station and Copenhagen police headquarters. At 04:50, money and other high-value mail was loaded from the trains to a yellow armored postal van, call sign 8886 K5B, with the driver "JF" and the guard "FA". The van had a direct radio link to police HQ, but the gang thought the radio link was to the postal HQ who would then have to phone the police before the police could respond to any robbery. At 05:00, 8886 left the postal terminal bound for the old main post office in Købmagergade, hence code K5. At around 05:02, 8886 passed and greeted the alfa-south police patrol car near Tivoli.

In the post office yard
At estimated 05:03, 8886 passed town hall square, where Carsten Nielsen spotted it and signalled the rest of the gang via their radios. Carsten Nielsen then jumped on a bicycle and pedalled to the orange van. At the same time, the gang put a blue "police" light on the stolen Ford Escort and drove to the post office. Marc Rudin and "member Y" were disguised as uniformed policemen, while Torkil Lauesen and "member X" were disguised as detectives. X and Y are Niels Jørgensen and Jan Weimann, but only the gang knows which is which. At estimated 05:06, the fake detectives and policemen arrived at the post office back gate in Løvstræde. The fake detectives started questioning the gatekeeper if he might have seen the perpetrators of a (made up) nearby assault, while the fake policemen pretended to search the yard.

At the same time, 8886 slowed down to a crawl as it turned down Niels Hemmingsens Gade. An early plan was to use a fake bicycle accident to attack 8886 here, but this was abandoned as being too risky. At 05:07, 8886 drove into the yard behind the old post office, the gatekeeper closed the gate, and JF reported safe arrival to the radio dispatcher. At estimated 05:07, FA got out of 8886 and rang the bell for the postal workers to pick up the cargo. At estimated 05:10, FA and two postal workers unloaded the mail to a cage on wheels on the loading ramp.

At 05:13:40, the fake uniformed policemen broke their cover and attacked FA on the ramp. JF called in the robbery to the radio dispatcher. The gang estimated a police response time from this point of two minutes from this point and (literally) started their countdown clock. At 05:14:00, the police dispatcher sent out the alarm requesting that any patrols in the area respond to the robbery. At 05:14, patrol car 0–11 with officer KB and his new rookie partner Jesper Egtved Hansen passed the Church of the Holy Ghost. Alfa-south and 0-11 responded to the alarm call and both drove towards the post office. At the same time, one fake policeman pushed over the cage with a loud bang. JF reported this bang as a gunshot to the radio dispatcher, so from this point on the police thought the gang had started shooting, but the gang knew they had not. Torkil Lauesen and X knocked down the gatekeeper, Torkil Lauesen opened the gate, and Carsten Nielsen backed the orange van into the yard. X did crowd control with the sawn off shotgun, while the other fake policeman stopped FA at gunpoint. The fake policemen loaded the loot into the orange van, and Torkil Lauesen joined them.

Escape and the killing
At 05:15:19, the gang finished loading the loot into the orange van and jumped in the back. X jumped into the front seat and they drove out the gate with 21 seconds to spare (according to their countdown watch), but alfa-south had already reached Løvstræde and 0-11 was getting in position around the corner to the left. At 05:15, one of the policemen from alfa-south fired twice at the orange van. One bullet hit a storefront, while the other bullet went through the back window, barely missed the gang members in the back, ricocheted off the side and lodged itself into the drivers seat cushion about an inch short of Carsten Nielsen's back. The orange van turned sharp right down Købmagergade and stopped abruptly. X jumped out and fired the shotgun in the general direction of 0–11.

A buckshot pellet hit officer Jesper Egtved Hansen in the head, killing him. There are three interpretations of this event:
 In court, the police argued that the shot was aimed at Jesper Egtved Hansen and the killing was intentional.
 Øvig claimed that the plan was to damage the pursuing patrol car (alfa-south) itself allowing the gang to escape, and the illegal buckshot round was chosen for its ability to destroy a car tire at a distance of 5 to 15 meters.
 In their 2009 response, the gang claimed the shot was a warning shot aimed over the policemen's heads but a stray bullet hit Jesper Egtved Hansen as he stood up on high ground to aim his gun at the gang. Øvig mentioned the use of a warning shot as an alternate use of the shotgun if the distance was more than 15 meters.

At 05:15, the orange van turned left down Klareboderne and got away. At 05:15:50, officer KB reported "officer down" to the radio dispatcher. At estimated 05:17, the orange van drove into an underground carpark in Klerkegade, where the gang transferred to two other getaway cars with the loot. At 05:20, the head of the police robbery squad got the call from the radio dispatcher. At 07:00, the operations chief of police intelligence Per Larsen heard of the robbery and immediately suspected the gang. At 08:15, the gang met up in Blekingegade with the loot, dispersed and resumed their normal daily duties to avoid suspicion. At 08:57, police intelligence units commenced 24/7 surveillance of the known gang members, which continued until their arrest.

1989 to 1995 Arrest and Punishment 
On April 13, 1989, the police arrested Peter Døllner, Torkil Lauesen, Jan Weimann, Niels Jørgensen and Niels Jørgensen's ex-wife. However, a search of their homes and workplaces did not provide any useful evidence except for some identical sets of keys. The police realised the keys were for the gang's secret hideout, but did not know the address. Between April 13 and May 2, 1989, Carsten Nielsen became scared and slightly paranoid due to the arrests, realizing he was next. However he managed to remove or destroy some of the evidence from the hideout in Blekinge Street, while staying with friends and family, constantly on the move.

On May 2, 1989, Carsten Nielsen accidentally drove his car, which was rented in his brother's name, into a lamppost. He was disfigured and blinded by the crash and was picked up by traffic police, who sent him to hospital and searched the car. Amongst the items in the car was a utility bill for the hideout in Blekinge Street. Carsten Nielsen was arrested in his hospital bed. Later that day, the police searched the hideout in Blekinge Street and discovered plenty of evidence awaiting destruction as well as a massive cache of weaponry not yet shipped to the PFLP. The sensational find of so much weaponry in a residential building prompted the press to give the gang its nickname "The Blekinge Street Gang".

The trial lasted from September 3, 1990, to May 2, 1991, before a verdict was reached. Due to the statute of limitations, all crimes before ca. 1980 and some later crimes were not included in the charges. Due to the inability to prove which gang member pulled the trigger or at least proving that the gang had planned to use deadly force, no person was convicted for the death of the young police officer, and this part of the case remained open. Some of the specific charges resulted in "not guilty" verdicts. On November 8, 1991, the sentences were confirmed by the supreme court on appeal. Marc Rudin was separately convicted for his role in the last robbery in October 1993. On December 13, 1995, the remaining gang members still in prison were released on parole (good behavior + 2/3 of the sentence served). Marc Rudin was released from prison in February 1997.

Key members 
 Gotfred Appel (September 1963 to May 4, 1978 (expelled)). Died in 1992. Founder of the official party.
 Ulla Hauton (September 1963 to May 4, 1978 (expelled)). Died in Spring 1989. Gottfred Appel's mistress and second wife.
 Jørgen Poulsen (period unknown, deceased). A part of KAK leadership until 1976. May or may not have known about the detailed gang activities.
 Jens Holger Jensen (Fall 1967 to September 15, 1980 (deceased)). Firefighter, paramedic, karate expert, most active member.
 Niels Jørgensen (1969 to April 13, 1989 (arrested)). Died September 2, 2008. Lab technician, Holger Jensen's best friend. Sentenced to 10 years of prison.
 Torkil Lauesen (1971 to April 13, 1989 (arrested)). Sentenced to 10 years of prison.
 Jan Weimann (1967 to April 13, 1989. (arrested)). Computer consultant at major national suppliers, allegedly had trusted access to police computers in the months before his arrest. High school friend of Holger Jensen. Sentenced to 10 years of prison.
 Bo Weymann (1982 to April 1988 (resigned from gang)) Research librarian, younger brother of Jan Weimann. Worked with Jan at the computer supplier. Sentenced to 7 years of prison.
 Peter Døllner ( to February 1985 (resigned from gang)) Carpenter. Sentenced to 1 year of prison, released with "time served" after sentencing.
 Karsten Møller Hansen (???? to 1989 (arrested)). Sentenced to 3 years of prison, released with "time served" after sentencing.
 Carsten Nielsen (December 1987 to May 2, 1989 (crashed car, blinded and arrested)) Getaway driver. Sentenced to 8 years of prison.
 Marc Rudin (on loan from PFLP during final robbery) PFLP operative from Switzerland.
 A female M.D. (could have been Saima Fahoum Jönsson, with the PFLP cover name Dina Carlsson, referred to as "Anna" in the Peter Øvig Knudsen books, nameless in the Moos book) was not a gang member but provided identities of patients for temporary identity theft and information on medical sedation procedures (officially given under false pretenses, she did not know the real purpose). Neither charged nor convicted and today an elected politician in Lund, Sweden.

Sources and further reading 
This article is largely based on Danish-language sources. However, there is an English-language history of the group: Gabriel Kuhn's Turning Money into Rebellion: The Unlikely Story of Denmark’s Revolutionary Bank Robbers, published in 2014 by the radical publishers Kersplebedeb and PM Press.

References

External links 
Peter Øvig Knudsens home page (in English and Danish)
Living Memory Extract from Blekingegadebanden. Den danske celle, a book about the group (in English)
Blekingegadebanden – The Gang of Blekinge Street

Outlaw gangs
Danish outlaws
Trials in Denmark
Gangs in Denmark
Communism in Denmark